Helge Mehre  (1 February 1911 – 17 September 1997) was a Norwegian military officer.

Personal life
Mehre was born in Narvik as son of veterinarian Karl Georg Mehre and Helga Olrik. He married Eva Østgaard in 1952. They resided at Strand. He died in September 1997 in Oslo.

Career
During World War II Mehre was in command of the No. 332 Squadron RAF in 1942, and served with the No. 132 Wing RAF from 1943 to 1945. His war decorations included the War Cross with Sword, the Defence Medal 1940–1945, the War Medal, the Haakon VII 70th Anniversary Medal, the British Distinguished Service Order and Distinguished Flying Cross, and the American Distinguished Flying Cross. He was promoted to Major General in 1959.

From 1963 he was head of the Air Command Sør-Norge. He was head of the Norwegian Joint Staff College from 1971 to 1972. From 1973 to 1976 he was commander of Akershus Fortress. His memoir book  was published in 1982.

He was also decorated with the Order of the British Empire, as a Commander of the Order of the Sword and the Order of Orange-Nassau.

Selected works

References

1911 births
1997 deaths
People from Narvik
Norwegian Army Air Service personnel of World War II
Royal Norwegian Air Force personnel of World War II
Norwegian World War II pilots
Norwegian Royal Air Force pilots of World War II
Royal Norwegian Air Force generals
Norwegian World War II memoirists
Recipients of the War Cross with Sword (Norway)
Recipients of the Distinguished Flying Cross (United Kingdom)
Members of the Order of the British Empire
Commanders of the Order of the Sword
Commanders of the Order of Orange-Nassau
Recipients of the Distinguished Flying Cross (United States)
Norwegian memoirists
Norwegian military writers
20th-century memoirists